Crowd Lu (born 15 July 1985) is a Taiwanese singer, songwriter and actor. He is also nicknamed "Vitas Lu" after making a parody of the song Opera No. 2 by the Russian singer Vitas, having the ability to hit the same high notes. Due to a serious car accident in his first year at Tamkang University, Lu learned to play guitar during his hospitalization. The following year, Lu won first prize for musical composition and solo performance and proceeded to once again take the gold in composition and become the crowd favorite at National Chengchi University.

In 2009, Lu won Best New Artist and Best Composer at the 20th Golden Melody Awards.

Early life
Crowd Lu was raised in a household rich with culture and focused on the arts in Tainan City, Taiwan. His mother was a lover and collector of Western jazz records, which sparked a similar—if not greater—musical interest within Lu at a very young age. The glimmer of Lu's talent was apparent as he would belt out the songs of Whitney Houston and Michael Jackson only after listening to them once or twice.  Lu's grandmother also contributed to his musical versality. His grandmother was a fan of local Taiwanese dramas and would sing theme songs from these dramas to Lu and his sister to coax them to sleep. It was most likely at this time that Lu developed his signature style- carefree, sincere, and youthful.

After graduating from the Tainan Guangming High School in 2003, Lu moved north to Taipei to attend Tamkang University. Although he intended on majoring in electrical engineering, due to his near fatal car accident, Lu was forced to switch his major to Spanish Literature.

Career
In his first year at Tamkang University, Lu was run over by a bus and suffered severe injuries in both legs. As a result, Lu spent months in the hospital, during which he picked up the guitar and experimented with musical composition. The following year, Lu won first prize for musical composition and solo performance at a Tamkang University singing contest and proceeded to once again take the gold in composition and to become the crowd favorite at a similar contest at National Chengchi University. Lu caught the eye, and ears, of prominent music record producer Zhong Cheng Hu, and, with Zhong, produced three singles.  Of them, "Good Morning, Beautiful Dawn!" appeared on the Taiwan Musical Society's Top Ten Singles in 2007. By mere word of mouth, Lu sold 15,000 CD's of his singles.

In late 2006, for a little more than a year, Lu toured all of Taiwan, hopping from diners to universities, and created a huge following, especially among university students.

In 2008, Lu ended his tour with 100 concerts and, on 25 May, came out with his first CD 100 Ways of Living. Filled with the simple honesty of everyday life, 100 Ways of Living topped the charts and altered the course of the heavily Mando-pop musical industry and taste in all of Asia dramatically.

On 23 August 2008, Lu had his own first official concert, only 88 days after his hit CD came out.

In 2009, Lu's albums Seven Days (七天) and Live in Taipei International Convention Center (TICC) were both awarded one of the Top 10 Selling Mandarin Albums of the Year at the 2009 IFPI Hong Kong Album Sales Awards, presented by the Hong Kong branch of IFPI.

Lu performed the  theme song of the film Your Name Engraved Herein,  the piece won Best Original Film Song at Taiwan's Golden Horse Film Festival and Awards. As of August  2022, the music video has garnered more than 58 million views on YouTube.

Discography

Studio albums

Filmography

Television series

Film

Awards and nominations

References

External links

1985 births
Living people
Musicians from Tainan
21st-century Taiwanese  male  singers
Taiwanese  male singer-songwriters
Taiwanese male television actors
Taiwanese male film actors
Taiwanese people of Hoklo descent
21st-century Taiwanese male actors
Male actors from Tainan